Mount Rath is an Antarctic mountain six nautical miles (11 km) north-northeast of Mount Owen, in the Hutton Mountains of Palmer Land.

Mount Rath was mapped by the United States Geological Survey (USGS) from surveys and from U.S. Navy air photos, taken from 1961 to 1967.  It was named by the Advisory Committee on Antarctic Names (US-ACAN) for Arthur E. Rath, an electronics technician who was stationed at the South Pole Station in 1964.
 

Mountains of Palmer Land